Mount Lokon, also known as Gunung Lokon, together with Mount Empung, is a twin volcano ( apart) in the Tomohon, Minahasa Regency, North Sulawesi, Indonesia, roughly  south of Manado. Both rise above the Tondano plain and are among active volcanoes of Sulawesi. Mount Lokon has a flat and craterless top. Its active crater is located on its foot, named "Tompaluan" crater.

History

Lokon formed during a period of andesitic volcanism on ring fractures resulting from the Tondano caldera's early to mid-Pleistocene collapse.  Recently erupted material remains andesitic in composition  and consists of ash plumes and, less commonly, pyroclastic flows and lava domes.

The volcano erupted on 15 July 2011, forcing thousands of people to evacuate.

The volcano again began showing signs of activity on 10 February 2012, and 19 September 2012 (11:01pm). An eruption occurred at 8:20, am the same day sending an ash plume two miles into the sky. Local residents have been evacuated from a two and a half mile exclusion zone around the volcano. An eruption occurred on 17 December 2012.

Indonesia has 129 volcanoes including Mount Lokon. The eruption of Mount Lokon in 1991 killed a Swiss hiker and forced thousands of people to flee their homes.

See also 

 List of volcanoes in Indonesia

References

External links 
 Lokon-Empung - Global Volcanism Program
 Flowers of Tomohon
 BBC report on eruption, 15 July 2011

Lokon
Lokon
Lokon
Lokon
Landforms of North Sulawesi
Holocene stratovolcanoes